Amanda Marie Nedweski (born December 1975) is an American financial analyst and Republican politician from Kenosha County, Wisconsin.  She is a member of the Wisconsin State Assembly, representing Wisconsin's 61st Assembly district since January 2023.  She is also currently a member of the Kenosha County board of supervisors.

She was previously known as Amanda Marie Madrigrano from 2002 through 2014.

Biography
Amanda Nedweski was born in Kenosha County, Wisconsin, and graduated from Mary D. Bradford High School in 1994.  She attended University of Wisconsin–Parkside, in Kenosha County, and earned her bachelor's degree in 1998.  She went to work for Braun Consulting after graduating, and in 2002 was hired by CNH Industrial as a financial analyst. 

She became a full time mom around 2006.

Political career
Nedweski first became politically active in opposition to distance learning in the Kenosha Unified School District during the COVID-19 pandemic.  In January 2021, she was a co-founder of the Kenosha chapter of Moms for Liberty—a conservative advocacy group directed at taking control of school boards.  That was followed by more aggressive confrontation with the Kenosha School Board in 2021.  Ultimately, she sought to organize a recall effort against Kenosha's school board president, but failed to collect enough signatures to force an election.  Following the failure of the recall petition, Nedweski won election to the Kenosha County board of supervisors in the Spring 2022 election, running in an open seat.  

In the same Spring 2022 election, incumbent state representative Samantha Kerkman was elected county executive of Kenosha County, and would therefore have to resign her Assembly seat.  Nedweski announced her campaign for Wisconsin State Assembly just a month after winning her seat on the county board.  She defeated bar owner Mike Honold in the Republican primary and went on to win 64% of the general election vote in the heavily Republican district.  

She will assume office in January 2023.

Personal life and family
Amanda Nedweski married Glenn Madrigrano, Jr., on October 19, 2002, and took the last name Madrigrano.  The Madrigrano family is well known in the Kenosha area, Glenn's great grandfather founded the family beer business, which is now a major beer distributor across southeast Wisconsin.  Amanda and Glenn Madrigrano had one son together before divorcing in 2014.  After the divorce, she changed her name back to Nedweski.

Electoral history

Kenosha County Board (2022)

| colspan="6" style="text-align:center;background-color: #e9e9e9;"| Nonpartisan Primary, February 15, 2022 (top two)

| colspan="6" style="text-align:center;background-color: #e9e9e9;"| General Election, April 5, 2022

Wisconsin Assembly (2022)

| colspan="6" style="text-align:center;background-color: #e9e9e9;"| Republican Primary, August 9, 2022

| colspan="6" style="text-align:center;background-color: #e9e9e9;"| General Election, November 8, 2022

References

External links
 Campaign website
 Official (county) website
 
 Amanda Nedweski at Wisconsin Vote

1975 births
Living people
Republican Party members of the Wisconsin State Assembly 
Women state legislators in Wisconsin  
People from Pleasant Prairie, Wisconsin
21st-century American women politicians
County supervisors in Wisconsin
University of Wisconsin–Parkside alumni
21st-century American politicians